Chemicals + Circuitry is the fourth album EP release by Dutch Aggrotech band, Grendel. It was released in Europe on November 27, 2009 through Infacted Recordings and in the United States on January 12, 2010 through Metropolis Records. It is the band's first album to feature non-distorted vocals.

Track listing

References

2009 EPs
Grendel (band) albums